"Baby You Can't Drive My Car" is the 644th episode of the American animated television series The Simpsons and the fifth episode of season 30.

Plot
Homer picks up "chicken" nuggets at Krusty Burger’s drive-through and eats them while he drives recklessly to the Springfield Nuclear Power Plant. At the entrance, the car hits a speed-bump and takes flight, crashing into Mr. Burns' office while Burns is showing Smithers the only Fabergé chicken; angered, Burns fires Homer. Later, Homer sees a TV news item for a startup company, CarGo, including a press event where Mayor Quimby touts jobs that will benefit the city. At CarGo, Homer interviews to be a "highly passive human" road tester of their self-driving car. The company founders see his bad driving record as an asset, and he is hired after passing their final test: sitting for hours doing nothing. His work amounts to enjoying various activities while the self-driving cars road test themselves.

One day after work, Marge arrives at CarGo to drive him home, and they enjoy the free food of the company's cafeteria. As Homer gives Marge a tour of the high-tech campus, they note that various recreational employee perks like a rock-climbing wall and game room go unused because the coders never stop working. Deciding to help the coders enjoy themselves, they call them down to join them instigating a foosball tournament, which the founders see as a "paradigm-blasting", team-building exercise that invigorates creativity. Seeking to innovate in employee satisfaction, they promote Homer and make him and Marge a team to boost employee morale. When Marge and Homer talk employees into trying out the company's regulation ice hockey rink with their office chairs, Homer videophones the activity to Lenny and Carl; they become the start of a mass exodus of employees who quit the nuclear plant to work for a fun employer. In response, Burns and Smithers work undercover at CarGo, where Burns commends the success of providing excellent employee motivation.

Meanwhile, Marge and Homer head home in a CarGo car, only to realize that it listens to their conversations and takes them to random places based on things that they randomly talk about. They report the problem to the founders, but are told it is a part of CarGo’s Sponsored Rides program selling users’ data to corporations; and that this insider information is covered by the non-disclosure agreement that Homer and Marge signed. Horrified at the unethical manipulation, Homer quits and vows to sue the company.

Homer, Burns and Smithers team up to stop the cars to end the company. With their CarGo credentials, they breach the main computer server room where Smithers works to reconfigure the deep neural network and disable the cars' fuel cells, but Marge confronts them with a Nerf bazooka gun. After pleading with Homer not to destroy the fun she is having from her job, she goes to report the situation to the founders, but notices CarGo's next phase, Sponsored Lives, an effort to use the cars' keychain fob to eavesdrop everywhere the keys go, even the bathroom. An appalled Marge then helps Smithers shut down the company by shooting a Nerf dart at the server keyboard. After the cars shut down, Springfielders are relieved and CarGo is bankrupted. Homer asks Burns to consider hiring him and Marge to work together at the plant, but Burns refuses and angrily begins to remember why he fired Homer until Marge shoots him in the head with a Nerf dart, causing him to forget. Homer and Marge then go home "self-driving the old-fashioned way" — drinking wine in Homer's car riding on a tow truck.

In the epilogue, the founders cite CarGo as a "bump in the road", and announce to their employees a new way to reach consumers; multi-lingual talking tattoos. During the closing credits, a scene from earlier in the episode shows Homer and Marge putting their CarGo car in "snuggle mode". They begin to make love in the car until it stops at the church, much to Reverend Lovejoy's frustration.

Cultural references
The title might be a reference to the Beatles song "(Baby You Can) Drive My Car"

During the scene where Homer drives recklessly while eating his food, he sings a parody of Jim Croce's "Operator (That's Not the Way It Feels)" about the meal. He also sings another parody of the song during the montage of him test-driving his CarGo vehicle. The scene where Homer binges on the free food at CarGo is framed against an instrumental of "Pure Imagination" from the 1971 film Willy Wonka & the Chocolate Factory.

The Fabergé chicken that Burns shows Smithers is based on the eggs of the same name.

The CarGo logo has the same color scheme as Argo AI's logo.

Reception
Tony Sokol of Den of Geek gave the episode 4 out of 5 points ranking, stating the episode is "maybe the closest to a classic 'The Simpsons' have offered in a long time. It is purely episodic. The subtle tweaks at the ruling class are timely, and the struggles at the center of it are universal. It's all about jobs. It's the economy, stupid. 'Baby You Can't Drive My Car' works specifically because the workplace is what we all have in common. Left, right and center, we all line up to earn a paycheck. We all want the perfect job. Many people have to drive to work, so we want the perfect car. Whether we like smoothies or not, we could all agree it would be fun to be able to make them while driving. In a driverless car society, the only thing to worry about is real drivers. This reviewer would like to know what the DWI laws will be, because a lot of cars ride on ethanol and, having drunk ethanol on the advice of Moe the bartender, it can be quite impairing."

Dennis Perkins of The A.V. Club gave the episode a B−, stating that "Homer is the one who gets up in arms about the data-mining, while Marge, swept up in all the good their joint venture is having on their marriage, at first decides that a company secretly stealing every scrap of Spiringfielders’ personal information is an insignificant price to pay. 'I can’t be the ethical one!' protests Homer at one point, and, well, he’s got a point. It’s sweet to see Marge and Homer dancing a graceful waltz in a virtual reality ballroom, and Marge’s anguished excuse that 'we were having so much fun!' is pretty heartbreaking when you think about it. But the conflict just doesn’t land, and when Marge (horrified that CarGo plans to extend the listening-in to the cars’ key fob—even in the powder room) finally decides to help Smithers, Burns, and Homer’s sabotage, it’s too thin a motivation."

"Baby You Can't Drive My Car" scored a 1.9 rating with a 7 share and was watched by 5.08 million people, making "The Simpsons" Fox's highest rated show of the night.

References

External links
 

The Simpsons (season 30) episodes